The Tikka T3 is a series of bolt-action rifles manufactured by Sako under their Tikka brand in Riihimäki, Finland since 2003. The series is available in a wide variety of different sight, calibre and stock configurations as well as several barrel lengths. The rifle series was developed by Sako product development team led by Kari Kuparinen.

In 2016, the series received an overhaul and the improved models were named Tikka T3x. The main changes were an enlargened ejection port, a steel recoil lug replacing the T3's aluminium lug, and a metal bolt shroud replacing the T3's plastic. All improved parts of the T3x are backward compatible with the older T3 models.

Users

: Licensed variant of the T3 CTR designated C19 manufactured by Colt Canada used by Canadian Rangers. The Tikka T3x Arctic is a civilian version of the C-19.
: T3 Tactical PN/GN used by French National Police and French National Gendarmerie. Chambered in 7.62×51mm.
: T3 TAC used by the Indian Navy MARCOS (Marine Commandos). A total of 177 rifles, chambered in 7.62×51mm.
: Used by Territorial Defense Forces.

See also
 Tikka M55 and Tikka M65, the original Tikkakoski factory rifles on which the Tikka rifle development is based on.
 Sako TRG, Sako long range sniper rifle series.

References

External links
 Official Tikka website

Bolt-action rifles of Finland
Sniper rifles
Hunting rifles